The Lochy River is a river of New Zealand, flowing into lower Lake Wakatipu.

See also
List of rivers of New Zealand

References

Rivers of Otago
Rivers of New Zealand